Lekki Lagoon is a lagoon located in Lagos and Ogun states in Nigeria. The lagoon lies directly to the east of Lagos Lagoon and is connected to it by a channel. It is surrounded by many beaches.

Real Estate Developments
There are two phases in the Lekki vicinity, which are Lekki phase I and Lekki phase II. Lekki phase I is considered to be one of the most expensive places to live in Lagos state. This is due to the latest housing developments which are being created on the Lekki phase I axis. It has been predicted by many that the Lekki Peninsula vicinity will soon become the best area to live and work in Lagos. The homes in Lekki are very big and expensive due to its high demand.

Due to the extensive construction going on at Lekki, major destruction of the remaining pristine swamps and little wildlife habitats left in Lagos state has occurred. The only place where any conservation of nature is found is at the Lekki Conservation center, run by the Nigerian Conservation Foundation. Lekki has two main local governments, Eti-osa and Epe.

References

Lagoons of Lagos
Lagoons of Yorubaland
Lekki